Katherine or Catherine Lee may refer to:

Catherine Lee, founder of Discovery Girls magazine
Catherine Lee (children's writer) (1847–1914)
Catherine Lee (politician) (born 1960), Taiwanese politician
Catherine Lee (painter) (born 1950)
Catherine Lee Ferguson or Kate Lee Ferguson (1841–1928), American novelist
Katherine Lee or Deltalina, flight attendant and presenter for Delta Air Lines campaign
Katherine Lee (actress) (1909–1968), American child actress
Katherine Lee (bowler), participated in Bowling at the 1987 Southeast Asian Games
Katherine M. Lee (schooner)

See also
Kate Lee (disambiguation)
Kathy Lee (disambiguation)